William Henry Wadsworth (July 4, 1821 – April 2, 1893) was a U.S. Representative from Kentucky.

Born in Maysville, Kentucky, Wadsworth attended town and county private schools.
He studied law and graduated from Augusta College, Bracken County, Kentucky, in 1841.
He was admitted to the bar in 1844 and commenced practice in Maysville, Kentucky.
He served as member of the Kentucky State Senate from 1853 to 1856.
He served as presidential elector on the Constitutional Union ticket in 1860.

Wadsworth was elected as a Unionist to the Thirty-seventh and Thirty-eighth Congresses (March 4, 1861 – March 3, 1865). His vote on the Thirteenth Amendment is recorded as nay.  He was not a candidate for renomination in 1864.

During the Civil War Wadsworth served as aide to General Nelson, with the rank of colonel, at the Battle of Ivy Mountain.
He was appointed United States commissioner to Mexico, under the treaty of Washington for the adjustment of claims, by President Grant in 1869.

Wadsworth was elected as a Republican to the Forty-ninth Congress (March 4, 1885 – March 3, 1887).
He was not a candidate for renomination in 1886.
He resumed the practice of law.
He died in Maysville, Kentucky, April 2, 1893.
He was interred in Maysville Cemetery.

References

 

1821 births
1893 deaths
People from Maysville, Kentucky
Kentucky Constitutional Unionists
Unionist Party members of the United States House of Representatives from Kentucky
Republican Party members of the United States House of Representatives from Kentucky
1860 United States presidential electors
Republican Party Kentucky state senators
19th-century American diplomats
Kentucky lawyers
Union Army colonels
People of Kentucky in the American Civil War
19th-century American politicians
19th-century American lawyers
Augusta College (Kentucky) alumni